Quat may refer to:

 Quat (surname), a Chinese surname
 Quaternary ammonium cation, a class of chemical molecules used as a disinfectant, surfactant, drug etc.
 Quaternion, a non-commutative extension of the complex numbers
 Quaternary (disambiguation), referring to four parts, divisions, or sets.
 Khat, an African plant whose leaves are chewed as a stimulant
 Phan Huy Quát, former prime minister of South Vietnam